Live Evolution is the title of a 2001 live album and a DVD released by the American progressive metal band Queensrÿche. It was recorded over two nights (July 27–28, 2001) at the Moore Theatre in Seattle, Washington. On the CD the tracks were collected in suites, which represent different moments of the band production and include a large section of the concept album Operation: Mindcrime. The DVD contains footage shot at the same concerts and features less songs listed in the order they were played during the shows.

Track listings

DVD track listing
"NM 156"
"Roads to Madness"
"The Lady Wore Black"
"London"
"Screaming in Digital"
"I Am I"
"Damaged"
"Empire"
"Silent Lucidity"
"Jet City Woman"
"Hit the Black"
"Breakdown"
"The Right Side of My Mind"
"I Remember Now"
"Revolution Calling"
"Suite Sister Mary"
"My Empty Room"
"Eyes of a Stranger"
"Take Hold of the Flame"
"Queen of the Reich"
Interviews
Highlights
PhotoGallery

Personnel
Band members
Geoff Tate - lead vocals
Michael Wilton - lead guitar
Kelly Gray - rhythm guitar, backing vocals
Eddie Jackson - bass, backing vocals
Scott Rockenfield - drums

Guest musicians
Pamela Moore - female vocals

Production
Kelly Gray - engineering, sound mixing
Tom Pfaeffle - mixing assistant
Kip Bjelman - Pro-Tools technician
Michael Drumm - DVD director and producer
Cory Brennan, Jaison John, Dan Russo - DVD producers

Charts

References

2001 live albums
Queensrÿche live albums
Sanctuary Records live albums
Queensrÿche video albums
2001 video albums
Sanctuary Records video albums
Live video albums
Albums recorded at the Moore Theatre